Cerda is a comune (municipality) in the Metropolitan City of Palermo in the Sicily region, Southern Italy, located about  southeast of Palermo.

Cerda borders the following municipalities: Aliminusa, Collesano, Sciara, Scillato, Sclafani Bagni, Termini Imerese and Montemaggiore Belsito.

References

External links
 Official website

Municipalities of the Metropolitan City of Palermo